Dara River may refer to:

 Dara, a tributary of the Drăgan in Cluj County, Romania
 Dara, a tributary of the Râul Doamnei in Argeș County, Romania
 An old spelling of Draa River

See also 
 Dara (disambiguation)